Fritz Reiff (1888–1953) was a German stage and film actor. Primarily a theatre actor, he appeared in a number of films made by the Munich-based company Bavaria Film in small, supporting parts.

Filmography

References

Bibliography 
 Klaus Volker. Fritz Kortner. Hentrich, 1987.

External links 
 

1888 births
1953 deaths
German male film actors
German male stage actors